Suevic may refer to:
 Suebi or Suevi, a large group of Germanic peoples
 SS Suevic, a steamship

Language and nationality disambiguation pages